David R. Goode (born 1941, Vinton, Virginia) is the retired Chairman, President, and CEO of Norfolk Southern Corporation (holding company engaged principally in surface transportation). Other directorships: Caterpillar Inc.; Delta Air Lines, Inc.; Georgia-Pacific Corporation; Norfolk Southern Railway, and Texas Instruments Incorporated.  Goode has been a director of Caterpillar since 1993. He is also on the Board of Directors of Delta Air Lines. He attended Duke University and Harvard Law School.  He was chosen as the Railroader of the Year by industry trade journal Railway Age for 1998 and again in 2005.

The Norfolk Southern office building in midtown Atlanta was named in his honor in 2005.

He is also known for ending the original steam program in 1994. In 2015, he admitted that it was mistake.

Goode is a member of Augusta National Golf Club.

References

Bibliography

External links

20th-century American railroad executives
Norfolk Southern Railway people
Caterpillar Inc. people
Living people
Duke University alumni
Harvard Law School alumni
American railroaders
1941 births
People from Vinton, Virginia